Albert J. Kocer (July 10, 1930 - June 12, 2018) was an American politician in the state of South Dakota. He was a member of the South Dakota House of Representatives from 1977 to 1992.

References

2018 deaths
1930 births
Democratic Party members of the South Dakota House of Representatives
People from Wagner, South Dakota
Businesspeople from South Dakota
20th-century American businesspeople